Huffam is a name. People with the name include:

Mark Huffam, a British film and television producer
James Palmer Huffam (1897–1968), a Scottish soldier and recipient of the Victoria Cross

See also
Charles Dickens (1812–1870), full name Charles John Huffam Dickens
The Quincunx (The Inheritance of John Huffam), an epic novel by Charles Palliser